Michael D'Arcy (born 7 March 1934) is an Irish former Fine Gael politician, and a former TD for the Wexford constituency.

D'Arcy's political career began in 1958, when his father Timothy died and Michael was co-opted into his seat, which he served in for fifteen years. He was first elected to Dáil Éireann at the 1977 general election, and held his seat until the 1987 general election when he lost it to Brendan Howlin of the Labour Party. He was re-elected at the 1989 general election, at the expense of party colleague Avril Doyle, but she regained her seat at the 1992 general election. D'Arcy was then elected to the 20th Seanad on the Agricultural Panel.

At the 1997 general election he was returned to the 28th Dáil, again unseating Avril Doyle. He lost his seat again at the 2002 general election, this time to the independent candidate Liam Twomey, who later joined Fine Gael.

In 1981, in Garret FitzGerald's first government, D'Arcy was appointed a Minister of State for Agriculture. In FitzGerald's second government in 1982, he was appointed as Minister of State at the Department of Fisheries and Forestry and at the Department of the Gaeltacht. He was dismissed in February 1986.

In 1999 he was elected to Gorey Town Council; he was re-elected at the 2004 local elections, and retired in 2009.

His son Michael W. D'Arcy is a former politician. He was elected to the Dáil at the 2007 general election, representing Wexford, and was re-elected at the 2016 general election. He was a member of Seanad Éireann from 2011 to 2016, and again in 2020.

See also
Families in the Oireachtas

References

1934 births
Living people
Fine Gael TDs
Members of the 21st Dáil
Members of the 22nd Dáil
Members of the 23rd Dáil
Members of the 24th Dáil
Members of the 26th Dáil
Members of the 20th Seanad
Members of the 28th Dáil
Local councillors in County Wexford
Irish farmers
Ministers of State of the 24th Dáil
Ministers of State of the 22nd Dáil
Fine Gael senators